Jeffrey Blair Kopp (born July 8, 1971) is a former American football linebacker in the National Football League (NFL).

Early years
Kopp attended San Ramon Valley High School in Danville, California.

College career
Kopp played college football at the University of Southern California (USC).

Professional career
Kopp played for the NFL's Miami Dolphins (1995), Jacksonville Jaguars (1996–1998), Baltimore Ravens (1998–1999) and New England Patriots (1999). He was head coach for the Providence School of Jacksonville Stallions

References

1971 births
Living people
American football linebackers
Baltimore Ravens players
Jacksonville Jaguars players
Miami Dolphins players
New England Patriots players
USC Trojans football players
People from Danville, California
Sportspeople from the San Francisco Bay Area
Players of American football from California